Baramotichi Vihir is a stepwell in 'Limb', Satara village in Satara district in the Indian state of  Maharashtra . It was constructed between 1719 and 1724 by Virubai Bhosale (a secondary wife of Chatrapati Shahu Maharaj) to supply water to some 300 nearby mango plantations. It is 110 ft deep and 50 ft in diameter. Limb village is situated around 16 km from Satara and approximately 99 km from Pune. .

Design 
The well is octagonal and looks like a dug-out Shivling. The entire structure of the stepwell is made of black stone. 

With its 12 moats, it was meant to be a water source to the surrounding farms. It was also utilized to relieve the overflow of water during monsoon times. From the top, visitors can see a few tiny walls and water channels. Various old statues and historical structures are found in this well. Mahal is also situated there

References

Stepwells in India
Tourist attractions in Satara district
Buildings and structures in Maharashtra
Satara (city)
Water Heritage Sites in India